Ophiodes fragilis, the fragile worm lizard, is a species of lizard of the Diploglossidae family. It is found in Argentina, Paraguay, and Brazil.

References

Ophiodes
Reptiles described in 1820
Reptiles of Argentina
Reptiles of Paraguay
Reptiles of Brazil
Taxa named by Giuseppe Raddi